The Igálá are one of the ethnic groups found in Nigeria. The Igala played significant roles in the formation of Nigeria having been made host to the capital of Nigeria at Lokoja in the past, with Lugard as the Governor. The Igala Kingdom expanded beyond the present-day boundary. The area was formerly known as the Igala Division of Kabba province and is now part of Kogi State. The capital is Idah in Kogi state. Igala people are majorly found in Kogi state. They can be found in Idah, Igalamela/Odolu, Ajaka, Ofu, Olamaboro, Dekina, Bassa, Ankpa, Omala, Lokoja, Ibaji, and Ajaokuta Local government all in Kogi state.

Culture 

The Igala kingdom is ruled by an "Attah", of all of whom Atta Ayegba Oma Idoko and Atta Ameh Oboni are the two most revered. In Igala lore, Oma Idoko is said to have offered his beloved daughter by burying her alive to ensure that Igala won a war of liberation from Jukun dominance. Atta Ameh Oboni is known to have been very brave and resolute because of his stiff resistance against the British and struggle to uphold the ancient traditions of Igala land. He died by suicide in order to forestall the plans of the British, who wanted him deposed and exiled.

Idakwo Micheal Ameh II became the twenty-seventh Attah following the death of his predecessor Attah Alhaji Aliyu Obaje in 2012. In Igala culture, most parts of the kingdom, like Ankpa, recurved three deep cut horizontal cuts on each side of their face beside the mouth as a way of identifying each other. This practice, which was prevalent during inter - tribal wars in the 17th century and 18th century has now become very uncommon among the Igala people.

By Igala native law and custom, an  Attah newly nominated by the four ruling royal houses ( Aj’Ameacho, Aj’Aku, Aj’Akogu and Aj’Ocholi) is verified by the Igalamela Kingmakers, traditional chiefs of the Igala kingdom. The Igalamela kingmakers are made up of nine chiefs (Etemahi Igalamela, Agbenyo, Onubiogbo, Onede, Aleji, Okweje, Achadu Kekele Ukwaja, Ananya Ata, Achanya Ata) with Etemahi Igalamela as the head of the Kingmakers. The Kingmakers forward the nominated name to the prime minister of the Igala kingdom, known as the Achadu oko-ata, for onward approval by the Kogi State Government.

History 

The word anẹ̀ Igala means Igalaland is regarded to be the territory where the people are speaking the Igala language. The early settlement in the Igala kingdom were founded by the ancestors of the people now known as the Igala-Mela with traditions that means "the nine Igala". The efunyi or ofigbeli was a large unit of settlement consisting of two or more several headsteads under their am'onofe -unyi, the family heads. In these primary settlements, membership was strictly based on agnatic kinship ties such as Am'om'onobule, the am'ana, the in-laws, the am'adu, the domestic slaves were absorbed into the settlement on the understanding that they accepted their social and political limitations in certain issues.

Igala Concept of God 
àbó Ígáláà regard God or Ọjọ́-chàmáchālāà as all-knowing and all-seeing, a similar worldview to that of the Abrahamic faiths that originated in the Middle East and have now started to eclipse traditional faiths.

However, to access this God and to ascertain what He is saying per time, Ifa needs to be consulted.

To this end, all the demigods, especially the natural elements of water and land, are given sacrificial offerings periodically. This is done to gain their favour.

Another aspect of deity amongst the Igalas is the Ibegwu, Ibo (people) egwu (dead). The spirits of the departed souls play an important role in the various clans. It is believed that they see everything and know everything, and hence are good in arbitration. The Ibegwu judges the actions of the living, especially in cases of land disputes, infidelity, family disputes and general conducts regarding sex and sexuality (Ibegwu forbids sex in daytime, oral sex, brothers sharing the same sex partners, etc.). However, Ibegwu is only potent on individuals whose families are connected to it. Families that have no ties with Ibegwu do not usually feel their impact. When Ibegwu judges a person of wrongdoing, the consequence is the manifestation of diseases that defy medical solution.

Notable Igala people
Abubakar Audu
Aliyu Obaje
Emmanuel Dangana Ocheja
Prof. Gabriel Oyibo
Prof. Francis Suleiman Idachaba
Evang. Sunday Oguche
Evang. Emma Ibrahim
Dr. Hassan Achimugu
Arome Osayi
Gideon Odoma
Theophilus Sunday
Abigail Omonu
Dr. Ibrahim Wada
Ogwu James Onoja
Praiz
Jeremiah Attaochu
Lucy Jumeyi Ogbadu
Joseph Benjamin
Ibrahim Idris
Idris Wada
Stephen Makoji Achema
Edward David Onoja

References

External links
Ethnologue entry

Ethnic groups in Nigeria